Irwin Douglas "Tack" Kuntz is an important figure in the field of computer-aided drug design and molecular modeling.  He is a pioneer in the development and conception of the area of study known as molecular docking.  One of the first docking programs DOCK was developed in his group in 1982.

Education
Tack received his Bachelor of Arts degree in physical chemistry from Princeton University in 1961 and  his PhD from the University of California, Berkeley in 1965 for spectroscopic studies of photosynthesis.

Career and research
He moved to the Department of Pharmaceutical Chemistry the University of California, San Francisco in the early 1970s.  He founded the Molecular Design Institute at UCSF in 1993. He was awarded the UCSF medal in 2018.

References 

Living people
Molecular modelling
University of California, San Francisco faculty
Princeton University alumni
University of California, Berkeley alumni
Year of birth missing (living people)